Ainsley Ndlovu (born 26 January 1996) is a Zimbabwean cricketer. He made his international debut for the Zimbabwe cricket team in June 2019.

Domestic career
He made his first-class debut for Matabeleland Tuskers in the 2014–15 Logan Cup on 8 February 2015. He made his Twenty20 debut for Zimbabwe in the 2017 Africa T20 Cup on 15 September 2017. In December 2020, he was selected to play for the Tuskers in the 2020–21 Logan Cup.

International career
In April 2019, he was named in Zimbabwe's One Day International (ODI) squad for their series against the United Arab Emirates, but he did not play. In June 2019, he was named in Zimbabwe's squad for their series against the Netherlands. He made his ODI debut for Zimbabwe against the Netherlands on 19 June 2019. He became the 26th bowler to take a wicket with his first delivery in an ODI match, when he dismissed Tobias Visee.

In September 2019, he was named in Zimbabwe's Twenty20 International (T20I) squad for the 2019–20 Bangladesh Tri-Nation Series. He made his T20I debut for Zimbabwe, against Afghanistan, on 14 September 2019.

In January 2020, he was named in Zimbabwe's Test squad for their series against Sri Lanka. He made his Test debut for Zimbabwe, against Sri Lanka, on 19 January 2020.

References

External links
 

1996 births
Living people
Zimbabwean cricketers
Zimbabwe Test cricketers
Zimbabwe One Day International cricketers
Zimbabwe Twenty20 International cricketers
Matabeleland Tuskers cricketers
Sportspeople from Bulawayo